Mundawar is a Tehsil in  Alwar District in Rajasthan State. Mundawar is 40 km from District Headquarter Alwar.

Geography
Mundawar is situated at latitude 38 16' 58" N and longitude 77° 9' 39" E in northern part of Alwar district of Rajasthan at an elevation of 263 m.

Location
Mundawar town is located in the National Capital Region, 125 km south of Delhi, 140 km north of state capital Jaipur, 39.5 km north of Alwar city, 28 km east of Behror 25 km east of Rewari city, 70 km south of Dharuhera, 65 km south of Bhiwadi and 20 km north of Tijara, another town in Alwar district.

It is easily reached from NH8 (Delhi-Jaipur-Mumbai highway) via Behror. Regular buses connect Mundawar to Behror, Khairthal, Rewari, Dharuhera, Bhiwadi, Tijara and Alwar.

Demography
Mundawar is a town with population of under 15000 in 2011 census.

Near by villages are Shyopur (1.5 km)
Tinkirudi (4 km), Siya Khoh (6 km), Chakoliya (10km), Padmara Khurdh (15 km), Ulaheri
(3.6 km), Chandpur (5.3 km), Khanpur Ahir (5.4 km).
Nearest Towns are Kishangarh Bas (15 km), Doonwas (18 km), Neemrana (21.3 km), Kotkasim (22.7 km), Behror (28 km).  Sabalgarh ( 4 km ),
(Pipli (7 km.)

Language
Ahirwati, also called ‘Hirwati’ (the language of Ahirs also Language of Rajputana), is spoken in Ahirwal region.

Rewari, Mahendergarh, Narnaul, Gurgaon, Kotkasim, Kotputli, Bansur, Behror and Mundawar may be considered as the centre of Ahirwati speaking area.

Nearby Cities

Bawal  25 km,
Alwar  45 km,
Rewari  41 km,
Narnaul  45 km.
Behror 28 km
Khairthal 15 km

Nearby Taluks

 Kishangarh Bas 23 km,
 Bawal 30 km,
 Neemrana 25 km,
 Behror 28 km

Villages in Mundawar Tehsil

 Agwani
 Ajarka
 Alipur
 Amoth
 Azizpur
 Badheen
 Badli
 Balloowas
 Bapdoli
 Bari
 Basni
 Bawad
 Beejwad Chauhan
 Beerod
 Behroj
 Behror Jat
 Bhagola Aheer
 Bhagolajat
 Bhajanawas
 Bhanot
 Bheekhawas
 Bheenwada
 Bhojpuri
 Bhoongara Aheer
 Bhoongara Thethar
 Birsangwas
 Birtoli
 Chakoliya
 Chandpur
 Cheeruni
 Chhabriwas
 Chhapur
 Choodla
 Dadhiya
 Dantla
 Darbarpur
 Dhailawas
 Dhokal Nagar
 Doonwas
 Gadli
 Gadoowas
 Gandhi Nagar
 Garhi
 Gola Hera
 Gopipura
 Hada Heri
 Hatoondi
 Hulmana Kalan
 Hulmana Khurd
 Ikrotiya
 Jagiwara
 Jalawas
 Jalpiwas
 Jasai
 Jeendoli
 Jeevan Singhpura
 Jhajharpur
 Jogawad
 Kadar Nagar
 Kali Pahari
 Kalooka
 Karni Kot
 Khanpur Mewan
 Khanpuraheer
 Khareta
 Khohri
 Khushalwas
 Kokawas
 Lakheempur
 Lamachpur
 Majra
 Majri Bhanda
 Majri Khola
 Mandha
 Manethi
 Manka
 Mator
 Mau
 Menpur
 Mirzapur
 Mohammadpur
 Molawas
 Mundanwara Kalan
 Mundanwara Khurd
 Mundawar
 Mundiya Khera
 Munpur
 Nahar Khera
 Nangal Baola
 Nangal Raniya
 Nangal Santokara
 Nangal Singal
 Nangal Siya
 Nangal Udiya
 Nangali Ojha
 Naredi
 Padmara Kalan
 Padmara Khurd
 Palawa
 Peepli
 Pehal
 Phusa Pur
 Qyara
 Radwa
 Raipur
 Rajwara
 Rambas
 Ramsinghpura
 Ranoth
 Rasgan
 Renagiri
 Rundh
 Sabalgarh
 Sanchod
 Sanoli
 Sarai Kalan
 Seel Gaon
 Seel Gaon Khurd
 Shahjadpur
 Shahpur
 Shamda
 Shekhawas
 Shital Pur
 Shreekrishan Nagar
 Shyopur
 Sihali Kalan
 Sihali Khurd
 Sirod Kalan
 Sirod Khurd
 Siya Khoh
 Sodawas
 Sorkha Kalan
 Sorkha Khurd
 Suheta
 Sukhman Heri
 Sundarwari
 Surajpura
 Swaroop Sarai
 Tatarpur
 Tehadka
 Tehadki
 Tejpura
 Tinkiruri
 Todarpur
 Ulaheri
 Vijay Nagar

Nearby airports
Indira Gandhi International Airport, New Delhi    112 km
Jaipur International Airport, Sanganer, Jaipur    150 km

Nearby tourist places
Neemrana   25 km,
Alwar   40 km,
Narnaul   52 km,
Nuh   57 km,
Sariska   63 km,
Manesar   73 km.

Nearby districts
Alwar   38 km,
Rewari   40 km,
Mewat   46 km,
Mahendragarh   66 km.

Nearby railway stations
Khanpur Ahir Railway Station 5 km,

Harsauli Railway Station 7 km,
Ajaraka Railway Station 10 km,
Khairthal Railway Station 14 km.

References

Cities and towns in Alwar district